Chandulal Chandrakar Memorial Government Medical College, ( also known as CCM Medical College / CM Medical College / GMC Durg / CMMC DURG) is a Government medical school located in Durg, Chhattisgarh, India named after Chandulal Chandrakar a journalist and politician of the area. It is affiliated with Pt. Deendayal Upadhyay Memorial Health Sciences and Ayush University of Chhattisgarh, Raipur.

The college is attached to District hospital, Durg for clinical postings of students and also has a 750 bedded hospital inside campus.

References

Medical colleges in Chhattisgarh
Colleges affiliated to Pt. Deendayal Upadhyay Memorial Health Sciences and Ayush University of Chhattisgarh
Buildings and structures in Durg
2013 establishments in Chhattisgarh
Educational institutions established in 2013